The 1973–74 Minnesota North Stars season was the North Stars' seventh season.

Coached by Jack Gordon (3–8–6) and Parker MacDonald (20–30–11), the team compiled a record of 23–38–17 for 63 points, to finish the regular season 7th in the West Division and failed to qualify for the playoffs.

Offseason

Regular season

Final standings

Schedule and results

Playoffs

Player statistics

Awards and records

Transactions

Draft picks
Minnesota's draft picks at the 1973 NHL Amateur Draft held at the Queen Elizabeth Hotel in Montreal, Quebec.

Farm teams

See also
1973–74 NHL season

References

External links

Minnesota
Minnesota
Minnesota North Stars seasons
Minnesota North Stars
Minnesota North Stars